Wilderness Run (formerly Jr. Gemini) is a steel kiddie roller coaster built by Liechtensteiner coaster manufacturer Intamin at Cedar Point in Sandusky, Ohio. Built in 1979, it was previously named after the ride that sits across the midway from it, Gemini. In 2014, Cedar Point renovated the Gemini Midway including Wilderness Run. Instead of blue paint, they used brown supports with green track to match the nearby Camp Snoopy children's area. After exiting the 19-foot-tall lift hill, the coaster train goes through a 270-degree turn to the left, followed by a small hill over the beginning of the lift hill. The train then goes through a 270-degree turn to the right which leads to the station.

Structure and Colors
The ride is made of tubular steel with brown steel supports and green track.  The queue goes underneath the last bunny hill of the roller-coaster. The train is painted orange and yellow with a red stripe.

As Jr. Gemini, the ride had all blue track and supports with a multicolored train with the first car painted yellow, the second car painted red, the third car painted orange, and the fourth car painted purple.

References

External links
 Cedarpoint.com - Official Wilderness Run page
 Jr Gemini at The Point Online

Junior roller coasters
Cedar Point
Roller coasters introduced in 1979
Roller coasters operated by Cedar Fair
Roller coasters in Ohio
1979 establishments in Ohio